The Brooklyn Democracy Academy is a transfer school for over-age/under-credited students, located in the Brooklyn borough of New York City, New York. The school is a collaboration between the New York City Department of Education and the Jewish Child Care Association (JCCA), one of the oldest social-service agencies in New York City.

See also

 List of high schools in New York City

External links
NYC Department of Education: Brooklyn Democracy Academy

Educational institutions in the United States with year of establishment missing
Public high schools in Brooklyn